Nantou railway station is an elevated station of Guangzhou-Zhuhai Intercity Railway.

The station is located at Nantou Dadao, Nantou Town, Zhongshan, Guangdong, China. It is the first station in Zhongshan for the rail in Zhuhai direction. It is called to be the "Main Gate of Zhongshan". It started operations on 7 January 2011.

References

Zhongshan
Railway stations in China opened in 2011